The Law 1420 of General Common Education of Argentina was a landmark national law that dictated public, compulsory, free, and secular education. It was passed in 1884 during the administration of President Julio Argentino Roca, after a number of similar laws of provincial scope and the conclusions of the Pedagogical Congress of 1882.

The nonreligious education mandated by the law was controversial and caused a conflict between the Argentine government and the Catholic Church. The Papal Nuncio, Luis Mattera, spoke against the law.

The government replied that Mattera was free to expose his ideas privately but not to interfere in government matters. Mattera tried to stop the arrival of school teachers hired by the Argentine authorities in the United States for the direction of public secular establishments. Opposition to the law came also from priests' sermons, Church newspapers, documents by bishops, and demonstrations supported by the clergy.

When the first Normal School was established in Córdoba, the Capitular Vicar, Gerónimo Clara, and priests denounced it from the pulpits as anathema. Clara was arrested and charged by the national authorities.

Mattera spoke to the head of the school and asked for a number of conditions to be met, including the teaching of the Catholic religion in the establishment. Those requirements were conveyed to the provincial government and, in turn, to the national authorities, which rejected them as interference by a foreign agent. Mattera ended up apologizing through a particular missive to Roca.

References
In Spanish unless otherwise noted.
 Herbón, A.; Román, C.; Rubio, M. E. Transformación del sistema educativo en Argentina a partir de la nueva Ley Federal de Educación.
 Historia General de las Relaciones Exteriores de la República Argentina. La oposición del nuncio papal monseñor Mattera a la ley 1420 de educación común, laica y obligatoria.

See also
 Church–state relations in Argentina
 Education in Argentina

Law 1420
Law 1420
1884 in Argentina
1884 in law
Education law
History of education in Argentina